José Gregorio Herrera (born February 24, 1997) is a Venezuelan professional baseball catcher for the Arizona Diamondbacks of Major League Baseball (MLB). He made his MLB debut in 2022.

Career
The Arizona Diamondbacks signed Herrera as a free agent on July 8, 2013. Herrera made his professional debut in 2014, spending time with the Arizona League Diamondbacks and the rookie-level Missoula Osprey. In 2015, Herrera spent the year with the AZL Diamondbacks, hitting .304/.415/.380 in 24 games with the team. He returned to Missoula the following season, posting a slash of .277/.351/.438 with 5 home runs and 18 RBI in 36 appearances. Herrera split the 2017 season between the AZL Diamondbacks and the Single-A Kane County Cougars, with whom he spent the majority of the year. In 66 games between the two affiliates, Herrera slashed .227/.291/.318 with 1 home run and 29 RBI.

On April 10, 2018, Herrera was suspended 50 games after testing positive for methylhexaneamine and oxilofrine, which were both listed as banned substances under the Minor League Drug Prevention and Treatment Program. Herrera only played in 38 games in 2018 due to the suspension. In 2019, Herrera split the year between Kane County and the High-A Visalia Rawhide, slashing .252/.383/.371 with 5 home runs and 43 RBI in 90 total games. Herrera did not play in a game in 2020 due to the cancellation of the minor league season because of the COVID-19 pandemic. He split the 2021 season between the Double-A Amarillo Sod Poodles and the Triple-A Reno Aces, batting a combined .258/.364/.422 with career-highs in home runs (11) and RBI (57).

The Diamondbacks added him to their 40-man roster following the season on November 8, 2021. Herrera made the Diamondbacks' Opening Day roster in 2022 as the backup to starting catcher Carson Kelly. He made his MLB debut on April 9, 2022, as the starting catcher against the San Diego Padres.

References

External links

1997 births
Living people
People from Cojedes (state)
Venezuelan expatriate baseball players in the United States
Major League Baseball players from Venezuela
Major League Baseball catchers
Arizona Diamondbacks players
Arizona League Diamondbacks players
Missoula Osprey players
Hillsboro Hops players
Kane County Cougars players
Visalia Rawhide players
Amarillo Sod Poodles players
Reno Aces players
Águilas del Zulia players